Collen Warner (born June 24, 1988) is an American professional soccer player who plays as a midfielder. He last played for Major League Soccer club Colorado Rapids.

College and amateur
Warner attended Denver East High School, played club soccer for Colorado Rush, and spent time training with English Premier League players and coaches at the Liverpool Youth Academy in 2002, before playing four years of college soccer at the University of Portland. He was named to the All-West Coast Conference Freshman Team and received an All-WCC Honorable Mention as a rookie in 2006, was named to the All-WCC First Team and to Top Drawer Soccer's All-Season Third Team in 2007, and was named to the All-WCC First Team for the second consecutive year in 2008, when he led the Pilots with eight assists and was second on the team with five goals.

During his college years Warner also played for both Colorado Rapids U-23 and Portland Timbers U23s in the USL Premier Development League.

Club career

Real Salt Lake 
Warner was drafted in the first round (15th overall) of the 2010 MLS SuperDraft by Real Salt Lake. He made his professional debut on April 17, 2010, in a game against Los Angeles Galaxy. Warner went on a short-term loan to USSF Division 2 club AC St Louis on July 28, 2010.

Montreal Impact 
Warner was left exposed by Real Salt Lake in the 2011 MLS Expansion Draft and was selected by expansion side Montreal Impact.

Toronto FC 
Warner was traded to Toronto FC for Issey Nakajima-Farran on May 16, 2014.

Houston Dynamo 
Warner was traded to Houston Dynamo for a second-round draft pick on March 2, 2016.

Minnesota United FC
On December 13, 2016, Minnesota United FC drafted Warner in the second round of the 2016 MLS Expansion draft. 

Warner was released by Minnesota at the end of their 2018 season.

FC Helsingør
On 17 April 2019, FC Helsingør announced the signing of Warner on a free transfer. The deal ran out to the end of the season.

Colorado Rapids
On June 30, 2020, Warner signed a one-year deal with his hometown team Colorado Rapids.

Career statistics

Honours 
Montreal Impact
 Canadian Championship: 2013

References

External links

Portland Pilots bio

1988 births
Living people
American soccer players
American expatriate soccer players
American people of Anguillan descent
Portland Pilots men's soccer players
Colorado Rapids U-23 players
Portland Timbers U23s players
Real Salt Lake players
AC St. Louis players
CF Montréal players
Toronto FC players
Houston Dynamo FC players
Rio Grande Valley FC Toros players
Minnesota United FC players
FC Helsingør players
Colorado Rapids players
Colorado Rapids 2 players
American expatriate sportspeople in Canada
Soccer players from Denver
University of Portland alumni
Real Salt Lake draft picks
Expatriate soccer players in Canada
USL League Two players
Major League Soccer players
USSF Division 2 Professional League players
USL Championship players
Danish 1st Division players
Association football midfielders
MLS Next Pro players